Jacqueline "Jacky" Sarah Wruck (born 5 November 1998) is a German model. She won the 15th season of Germany's Next Topmodel.

Biography
Wruck applied for the 15th season of Germany's Next Topmodel, but only joined the show after the start of the season together with two other candidates as a replacement. She accompanied Klum to the amfAR-Gala in New York and ran on the New York Fashion Week. In the final she won Euro 100,000 and a contract with ONEeins fab. She also appeared on the cover of the magazine Harper's Bazaar.

Before her modeling career, Wruck worked as a veterinary assistant in her parents' veterinary practice. She lives in the Rheingau.

References

German female models
1998 births
Living people